Bone Brothers is the self-titled debut studio album by American hip hop duo Bone Brothers, composed of Bone Thugs-N-Harmony members Bizzy Bone and Layzie Bone. It was released on February 22, 2005 via Koch Records. Production was handled by Dwayne "Deenucka" Johnson, Self and Mauly T, with Bizzy Bone, Steve Lobel and Layzie Bone serving as executive producers. It features guest appearances from Kareem, Outlawz, Treach, and several Mo Thugs members, such as Krayzie Bone, Felicia, Skant Bone, Stew Bone and Wish Bone. The album saw its release after the dismissal of Bizzy Bone from the group Bone Thugs-N-Harmony.

The album peaked at number sixty on the Billboard 200, number 18 on the Top R&B/Hip-Hop Albums, number 8 on the Top Rap Albums and number 3 on the Independent Albums in the United States. "Hip Hop Baby" was the only single released from this album.

Track listing

Charts

References

External links

2005 albums
E1 Music albums
Bone Brothers albums